Jeremiah Crowley  (January 12, 1832 – September 23, 1901) served as the thirty sixth Mayor of Lowell, Massachusetts.

See also
 103rd Massachusetts General Court (1882)

References

1832 births
1901 deaths
People of Massachusetts in the American Civil War
Mayors of Lowell, Massachusetts
Lowell, Massachusetts City Council members
Democratic Party Massachusetts state senators
Massachusetts lawyers
19th-century American politicians